José Salomón Rondón Giménez (born 16 September 1989) is a Venezuelan professional footballer who plays as a striker for Argentine Primera División club River Plate and the Venezuela national team.

After starting out at Aragua, he went on to spend most of his career in Europe, appearing in La Liga with Málaga, the Russian Premier League with Rubin Kazan, Zenit Saint Petersburg (winning the 2015 national championship with the latter club) & CSKA Moscow, and the Premier League with West Bromwich Albion, Newcastle United and Everton. A Venezuela international since 2008, Rondón is the country's all-time top goalscorer with 38 goals, and he represented his country in four Copa América tournaments.

Club career

Early years
Born in Caracas, Rondón's sporting idols growing up were Ronaldo and Michael Jordan. He made his debut in the Venezuelan Primera División at the age of 17, appearing for Aragua FC against Carabobo FC on 8 October 2006; on 8 April of the following year he scored his first goal(s) for the club, in a 2–2 draw against Caracas FC.

Las Palmas
In the summer of 2008, Rondón was signed by UD Las Palmas in Spain, and made his official debut on 5 October in a 1–2 away loss against Deportivo Alavés in the Segunda División. Almost a year after his arrival, on 2 September 2009, he netted his first goal, in a Copa del Rey match against Cádiz CF – becoming the youngest foreign player to ever score for the club, at the age of 19 years, 11 months and 17 days – and finished the season with ten goals in 36 games, as the Canary Islands side narrowly avoided relegation.

Málaga

On 19 July 2010, Málaga CF signed Rondón for a record €3.5 million transfer fee. He scored his first goal for the Andalusians exactly two months later, in a 1–2 home defeat against Sevilla FC in La Liga. Four days later, he opened the score in a 2–0 win at Getafe CF, adding a third the following week in a 2–3 home loss to Villarreal CF.

On 1 May 2011, Rondón contributed with one goal as Málaga came from behind at home to defeat Hércules CF 3–1. That was his 13th goal of the campaign, with which he surpassed the record of goals from a Venezuelan footballer in the Spanish top flight previously held by Juan Arango; the team finally escaped relegation, with the player finishing as their top scorer.

Rondón started 2011–12 on the substitutes bench. He eventually beat competition from ageing Ruud van Nistelrooy, again finishing as Málaga's best scorer – this included goals in narrow home wins against RCD Espanyol (2–1) and Levante UD (1–0), and a brace against Rayo Vallecano (4–2 success, also at La Rosaleda Stadium).

Rubin Kazan

In August 2012, Rondón signed for Russian Premier League team FC Rubin Kazan, for a reported fee of €10 million which made him the most expensive Venezuelan player in history. He made his league debut on the 12th in a 2–0 home win over FC Dynamo Moscow, and he scored his first goal against FC Terek Grozny on 1 September, albeit in a 1–2 home defeat.

Rondón made his first appearance in the UEFA Europa League against Inter Milan, and he scored once in a 2–2 group stage away draw, also playing the entire match. In the second match between the two sides he netted a brace in the final three minutes, helping his team to a 3–0 win.

On 10 March 2013, following the winter break in the Russian Premier League, Rondón scored the only goal of the match as Rubin claimed a home victory over reigning champions FC Zenit Saint Petersburg. In continental competition, he opened up the scoring in the 100th minute of the round-of-16 clash against Levante, latching on to a cross from Bibras Natcho as the hosts won it 2–0 in that leg and on aggregate.

On 19 April 2013, Rondón opened the scoring for Rubin, who could only manage a 1–1 draw at relegation-threatened FC Amkar Perm. In the club's next league match, against PFC CSKA Moscow, he netted the first goal in a 2–0 victory over the league leaders and eventual champions.

On 1 September 2013, Rondón scored a hat-trick in a 3–0 win against recently promoted FC Ural Sverdlovsk Oblast.

Zenit
On 31 January 2014, Rondón underwent a medical and joined fellow league club Zenit Saint Petersburg, signing a five-year contract for a fee in the region of £15.8 million. He played his first game for his new team on 25 February, scoring in an eventual 2–1 away win against Borussia Dortmund in the UEFA Champions League's round of 16-second-leg (4–5 aggregate defeat).

On 6 April 2014, again as a second-half substitute, Rondón scored a rare second-half hat-trick in a 6–2 home routing of former team Rubin. On 20 September he added another three, in a 5–0 win at FC Rostov.

On 26 February 2015, Rondón scored a brace at home against PSV Eindhoven, being essential in a 3–0 home victory for the Europa League round of 32 and a 4–0 aggregate triumph.

West Bromwich Albion

On 10 August 2015, Rondón joined English club West Bromwich Albion on a four-year-deal for a club-record fee of £12 million. He made his debut in the Premier League five days later, replacing Craig Gardner in the 62nd minute of an eventual 0–0 away draw against Watford. On 23 August, he made his first start, at the expense of Tottenham Hotspur-linked Saido Berahino, in a 2–3 home defeat to Chelsea, assisting James Morrison in his first goal and later being brought down by John Terry who received a straight red card.

Rondón scored his first goal for the Baggies on 29 August 2015, netting the game's only in stoppage time of the first half of the away fixture against nine-man Stoke City. On 19 December, he was sent off at the end of a 1–2 home loss to AFC Bournemouth for thrusting his head at Dan Gosling, with teammate James McClean also dismissed in the first half; he finished his first season in English football with ten goals.

Rondón began the 2016–17 campaign strongly, scoring the winner in the opening match win over Crystal Palace, then continued his impressive form in September with goals in consecutive matches against West Ham United and Stoke. On 21 November he netted once and provided an assist in a 4–0 victory over Burnley, and on 14 December, against Swansea City, he scored his first Premier League hat-trick after netting three headers in a 3–1 win, which was only the second time this feat was achieved in the history of the competition, the first being Everton's Duncan Ferguson in 1997.

Rondón's goal in a 1–1 draw with Tottenham, on 25 November 2017, made him the first Venezuelan to score at either the rebuilt Wembley Stadium or the original facilities, as well as the first Albion player to score at the new ground. The following 20 January, early into the second half of the away fixture against Everton, he accidentally broke James McCarthy's leg, and was reduced to tears upon realising the extent of McCarthy's injury; recalling the incident in an interview some months later also caused him to become upset.

Newcastle United
On 6 August 2018, Rondón joined Newcastle United on a one-year loan swap, with Dwight Gayle heading in the opposite direction. He made his debut five days later, in a 2–1 home loss against Tottenham on the opening day of the season. He scored his first goal in a 3–1 EFL Cup defeat at Nottingham Forest on 29 August.

Rondón opened his league account on 10 November 2018, scoring twice to help the hosts defeat Bournemouth 2–1. In the second half of the season, his partnership up front with Ayoze Pérez began to take shape and the Venezuelan often assisted the Spaniard with his goals. He also maintained a steady record in terms of goalscoring and was neck-and-neck with Pérez until the latter stages of the campaign, finishing with eleven league goals—just one behind his teammate.

In May 2019, Rondón was named Newcastle's player of the year, becoming the first forward to win the award since Alan Shearer in 2003.

Dalian Professional
On 19 July 2019, Rondón signed with Dalian Yifang of the Chinese Super League, reuniting with manager Rafael Benítez who had joined the club two weeks before and reportedly activated the player's release clause of £16.5 million.

CSKA Moscow
On 15 February 2021, Rondón joined Russian Premier League side CSKA Moscow on loan. In his first match at Arena CSKA, Rondón scored his first goal for the Moscow team and also gave an assist, merits that led him to be named the best player of the match. Furthermore, he was voted the best CSKA player of the month of March. Rondón ended his time at CSKA becoming one of the most valuable players in the Russian competition after participating in 37.5% of the team's goals since his arrival with four goals and two assists of the team's 16 goals in that time.

Everton
On 31 August 2021 Rondón joined Everton on a free transfer, reuniting with his former Newcastle and Dalian Pro manager Rafael Benítez. He signed a two-year contract with the option for a third season. He scored his first goal for the club in December 2021 against Crystal Palace in a 3–1 loss at Selhurst Park. In March 2022, he scored both goals in a 2–0 victory over National League side Boreham Wood at Goodison Park in the fifth round of the FA Cup. On 16 December 2022, Everton announced that Rondon had left "with immediate effect after reaching an agreement with the club to terminate his contract".

International career
Rondón appeared for the Venezuela under-20 side in the 2009 FIFA World Cup in Egypt. He scored four times during the competition – as teammate Yonathan del Valle, with both netting hat-tricks in the 8–0 group stage routing of Tahiti – as the former managed to qualify for the last-16 stage.

Previously, on 3 February 2008, 18-year-old Rondón made his debut for the senior team in a friendly with Haiti, scoring his first goal on 23 March against El Salvador (another exhibition match, another 1–0 win). In 2011, he took 4th place at Copa America. For this, the team received copper medals.
Selected by manager Noel Sanvicente to the 2015 Copa América, he scored in La Vinotintos first game of the tournament to help defeat Colombia 1–0; later that year, he was among 15 national players who threatened to quit the team after the president of the Venezuelan Football Federation accused them of conspiring to get the manager sacked.

On 5 June 2016, during the Copa América Centenario, Rondón earned his 50th cap, starting in a 1–0 group stage win against Jamaica in Chicago. He scored the only goal of the following game against Uruguay to become the first Venezuelan player to find the net at three tournaments, and repeated the feat in the quarter-finals, a 1–4 defeat to Argentina.

On 9 June 2019, after his brace in a 3–0 friendly victory over the United States in Cincinnati, Rondón surpassed former holder Juan Arango to become Venezuela's all-time top scorer at 24 goals.

Career statistics

Club

International

Scores and results list Venezuela's goal tally first, score column indicates score after each Rondón goal.

HonoursAraguaCopa Venezuela: 2007–08ZenitRussian Premier League: 2014–15
Russian Super Cup: 2015Individual'
Newcastle United Player of the Year: 2019

See also
List of top international men's football goalscorers by country

References

External links

1989 births
Living people
Venezuelan people of Colombian descent
Footballers from Caracas
Venezuelan footballers
Association football forwards
Aragua FC players
La Liga players
Segunda División players
UD Las Palmas players
Málaga CF players
Russian Premier League players
FC Rubin Kazan players
FC Zenit Saint Petersburg players
Premier League players
West Bromwich Albion F.C. players
Newcastle United F.C. players
Everton F.C. players
Chinese Super League players
Dalian Professional F.C. players
PFC CSKA Moscow players
Club Atlético River Plate footballers
Venezuela under-20 international footballers
Venezuela international footballers
2011 Copa América players
2015 Copa América players
Copa América Centenario players
2019 Copa América players
Venezuelan expatriate footballers
Expatriate footballers in Spain
Expatriate footballers in Russia
Expatriate footballers in England
Expatriate footballers in China
Expatriate footballers in Argentina
Venezuelan expatriate sportspeople in Spain
Venezuelan expatriate sportspeople in Russia
Venezuelan expatriate sportspeople in England
Venezuelan expatriate sportspeople in China
Venezuelan expatriate sportspeople in Argentina
Venezuelan Primera División players